Wu Zi Bei Ge, also known as Wu Zi Bei Ge: Wu Zetian Zhuan, is a 2006 Chinese television series based on the life of Wu Zetian, the only woman in Chinese history to assume the title of "Empress Regnant". The series was directed and written by Chen Yanmin, and starred Siqin Gaowa and Wen Zhengrong as the empress. The series' title Wu Zi Bei Ge literally means "Song of the Uncharactered Stele", with the "stele" referring to the unmarked one standing near Wu Zetian's tomb at the Qianling Mausoleum.

Cast

 Siqin Gaowa as Wu Zetian
 Wen Zhengrong as Wu Zetian (young) / Princess Taiping
 Zhang Tielin as Emperor Gaozong of Tang
 Fang Xu as Di Renjie
 Liu Wei as Emperor Taizong of Tang
 Liu Jinshan as Wei Shun'an
 Liao Xiaoqin as Shangguan Wan'er
 Yan Bingyan as Empress Wang
 Xie Jintian as Consort Xiao
 Li Xinyi as Lady of Wei
 Tan Yang as Lai Junchen
 Sha Jingchang as Wei Yuanzhong
 Xu Zhengting as Zhangsun Wuji
 Cao Jinsheng as Hao Chujun
 Wang Biao as Han Yuan
 Xia Feng as Lai Ji
 Zeng Qiusheng as Xu Jingzong
 Wang Deshun as Li Ji
 Xu Wenbin as Chu Suiliang
 Ying Da as Li Yuanjing
 Li Ding as Zhang Gongyi
 Zhao Jin as Pei Yan
 Yang Jun as Wu Yuanqing / Wu Sansi
 He Shengwei as Wu Yuanshuang / Wu Chengsi
 Lu Shiyu as Li Xian
 Wang Jinxin as Li Dan
 Li Yixiao as Wei Tuan'er
 Ma Jie as Li Yifu
 Wu Feifei as Consort Liu
 Liu Su as Consort Dou
 Zheng Yu as Liu Shi
 Zhou Yihua as Li Zhaode
 Zhou Shiyi as Xu Yougong
 Li Ming as Zhang Guangfu
 Xueshan as Xu Yanbo
 Li Yansheng as Zhang Jianzhi
 Zhao Chengshun as Su Liangsi
 Wang Hui as Xue Huaiyi
 Li Yang as Zhou Xing
 Ge Yaming as Suo Yuanli
 Ba Duo as Hou Sizhi
 Zhou Weitao as Li Hong
 Zhao Bo as Li Xian
 Li Xiaobo as Fu Youyi
 Xu Fengnian as Wang Xiaojie
 Zhu Chen as Zhang Yue
 Zhang Ping as Pei Xingjian
 Wang Jianing as Xu Jingye / Xu Jingzhen
 Cheng Wu as Zhang Changzong
 Chi Jia as Zhang Yizhi
 Li Rui as Zhang Changyi
 Wang Gang as Lou Shide
 Dali as Zhang De
 Li Bin as Liu Yicong
 Guan Huaitian as Li Ke
 Yu Jingliang as Di Guangyuan
 Tang Beiping as Chu Gui
 Xiahou Bin as Dou Xijian
 Cao Xuefei as Cui Xuanwei
 Fan Xiaoyang as Pei Feigong
 Li Xueping as Fan Yunxian
 Wang Chunyuan as Li Jiao
 Ren Chengwu as Li Zhen
 Zeng Hongsheng as Shangguan Yi
 Zhang Zhitong as Wu Zetian's mother
 Wang Yong as Chen Zi'ang
 Sun Leiyan as Liu Yizhi
 Xu Ming as Zhu Jingze
 Qi Ji / Zhang Xiaoxiao as Li Zhong
 Lu Dongchang as Qiu Shenji
 Zhang Erhe as Wang Fusheng
 Chen Xinhua as Ming Chongyan
 Dahai as Lu Mingyi
 Sun Hao as An Jinzang
 Li Li-chun as Wei Zheng
 Bai Yun as Xue Shao
 Chu Tong as Luo Binwang
 Liu Ping as Wang Deshou
 Wang Tianyi as Yue Yi
 Shi Lei as Li Longji
 Han Ziting as Li Sujie
 Sun Lijun as Prince of Dongping
 Bai Yunfei as Fang Yi'ai
 Jia Yue as Xue Wanche
 Zhang Zhenxing as Chai Lingwu
 Zhang Jingtu as Li Xiaoyi
 Pan Meiru as Cheng Wuting
 Xie Jian as Wang Qingzhi
 Li Yan as Su Anheng
 Chai Hao as Xiaomeng
 Sun Han as King of West Yi
 Bai Ma as Commander Wang
 Zhang Sanjin as old farmer
 Ji Qin as Abbess of Ganye Abbey
 Zhu Jian as nun
 Wang Yingqi as Zhou Lin
 Wu Huanyan as Empress Wei
 Jia Yulan as Princess Qianjin
 Ma Yashu as Princess Gaoyang
 Gao Yafan as Princess Baling
 Hai Yan as Mrs Zhangsun
 Yang Qian as Biyu
 Wang Xuanyi as Xiaohui
 Xu Lu as Xiaoying
 Zhang Qingchun as Lady Liu
 Lu Dong as Du Su
 Li Tong as Lady of Wei
 An Limin as Li Hui
 Cui Shaohui as Li Yuanying
 Liu Mengmeng as female official
 Zhou Yihao as Di Fu
 Song Lijie as Mrs Di

External links
  Wu Zi Bei Ge on Sina.com

2006 Chinese television series debuts
Television series set in the Tang dynasty
Television series set in the Zhou dynasty (690–705)
Works about Wu Zetian
Mandarin-language television shows
Chinese historical television series
Television series set in the 7th century
Cultural depictions of Wu Zetian
Cultural depictions of Di Renjie